USS Conyngham (Destroyer No. 58/DD-58) was a  built for the United States Navy prior to the American entry into World War I. The ship was the first U.S. Navy vessel named for Gustavus Conyngham.

Conyngham was laid down by the William Cramp & Sons of Philadelphia, in July 1914 and launched in July of the following year. She was armed with four  guns and had eight 21 inch (533 mm) torpedo tubes.

After her January 1916 commissioning, Conyngham sailed in the Atlantic and the Caribbean. After the United States entered World War I in April 1917, Conyngham was part of the first U.S. destroyer squadron sent overseas. Patrolling the Irish Sea out of Queenstown, Ireland, Conyngham made several rescues of passengers and crew from ships sunk by U-boats. Conynghams commander was commended for actions related to what was thought at the time to be a "probable" kill of a German submarine.

Upon returning to the United States in December 1918, Conyngham underwent repairs at the Boston Navy Yard. She remained there in reduced commission through 1921, with only brief episodes of activity. After returning to active service for about a year, she was decommissioned in June 1922. In June 1924, Conyngham was transferred to the United States Coast Guard to help enforce Prohibition as a part of the "Rum Patrol". She operated under the name USCGC Conyngham (CG-2) until 1933, when she was returned to the Navy. Later that year, the ship was renamed DD-58 to free the name Conyngham for another destroyer. She was sold for scrap in August 1934.

Design and construction 
Construction of the vessel was awarded to William Cramp & Sons of Philadelphia, which laid down her keel on 27 July 1914. Twelve months later, on 8 July 1915, Conyngham was launched by sponsor Miss A. C. Stevens, a great-great-granddaughter of the ship's namesake, Gustavus Conyngham (1744–1819), a Continental Navy officer.

Conyngham had two Curtis steam turbines that drove her two screw propellers, and an additional steam turbine geared to one of the propeller shafts for cruising purposes.

Conyngham was also equipped with eight  torpedo tubes. The General Board of the United States Navy had called for two anti-aircraft guns for the Tucker-class ships, as well as provisions for laying up to 36 floating mines. From sources, it is unclear if these recommendations were followed for Conyngham or any of the other ships of the class.

Early career 
USS Conyngham was commissioned into the United States Navy on 21 January 1916 under the command of Lieutenant Commander A. W. Johnson. Following her commissioning, Conyngham joined in tactics and war maneuvers off the east coast in 1916 and in the beginning of 1917 sailed to the Caribbean for war games and fleet maneuvers.

World War I 
On 24 April 1917 Conyngham sailed from Boston, Massachusetts with her division for Queenstown, Ireland, the first destroyers to join English forces for duty after the entry of the United States into World War I earlier that month. This force patrolled off the Irish coast and escorted convoys through the danger zone where German submarine operated.

The destroyers also providing rescue services for stricken ships. When the British ship  was torpedoed and sunk by German submarine  on 17 August 1917, Conyngham sped to her assistance and rescued 39 survivors. A similar distress call from the British ship  on 22 November—torpedoed by German submarine —resulted in the rescue of her 30-man crew by Conyngham.

The British Armed merchant cruiser  and ten destroyers, including Conyngham, were escorting an eastbound convoy of twenty steamers on 19 October, when German submarine  surfaced in the midst of the group. The submarine launched its only remaining torpedo at Orama, sinking that vessel. Lookouts on Conyngham saw U-62s periscope and quickly launched a depth charge attack on the spot where the U-boat had submerged, bringing oil and debris to the surface. Conynghams commanding officer was commended for his prompt and effective action, and the British Admiralty awarded Conyngham a "probable" kill on the submarine. Unfortunately for Conynghams record, though, U-62 had survived the encounter.

Post-war 
After the hostilities had ended on 11 November 1918 with Germany signing the Armistice, Conyngham sailed from Queenstown on 14 December 1918 for Boston to have an overhaul. From February to April 1919, the destroyer participated in fleet exercises and division maneuvers in the Caribbean. Returning to Boston, she was placed in reduced commission until 1921.

In June 1921, Conyngham accompanied a Cuban warship that was repatriating the remains of former Cuban President José Miguel Gómez to Havana. She returned to Newport, Rhode Island, for summer exercises with her squadron and, after wintering at Charleston, South Carolina, reported to Philadelphia Navy Yard in March 1922 for inactivation. She was decommissioned there on 23 June 1922.

United States Coast Guard career 
On 17 January 1920, Prohibition was instituted by law in the United States. Soon, the smuggling of alcoholic beverages along the coastlines of the United States became widespread and blatant. The Treasury Department eventually determined that the United States Coast Guard simply did not have the ships to constitute a successful patrol. To cope with the problem, President Calvin Coolidge in 1924 authorized the transfer from the Navy to the Coast Guard of twenty old destroyers that were in reserve and out of commission. Conyngham was reactivated and transferred to the Treasury Department on 7 June 1924 for use by the Coast Guard. Designated CG-2, Conyngham was commissioned on 8 March 1925, and joined the "Rum Patrol" to aid in the attempt to enforce prohibition laws.

After the United States Congress proposed the Twenty-first Amendment to end prohibition in February 1933, plans were made for Conyngham to be returned to the Navy. On 27 May 1933, Conyngham arrived at the Philadelphia Navy Yard, and was decommissioned nine days later, on 5 June. Conyngham was transferred back to the Navy on 30 June. Later in 1933, the ship was renamed DD-58 in order to free the name Conyngham for a new destroyer of the same name. DD-58 remained in noncommissioned status until struck from the Naval Vessel Register on 5 July 1934. She was sold for scrap on 22 August in accordance with the London Naval Treaty.

Notes

References

Bibliography

External links 
 

 

Tucker-class destroyers
Ships built by William Cramp & Sons
1915 ships
World War I destroyers of the United States
Ships of the United States Coast Guard